Kaltoum Bouaasayriya (born 23 August 1982 in Assa-Zag Province) is a Moroccan athlete. She competed in the 3000 metres steeplechase at the 2012 Summer Olympics, placing 36th with a time of 9:58.77.

References

1982 births
Living people
Moroccan female steeplechase runners
Olympic athletes of Morocco
Athletes (track and field) at the 2012 Summer Olympics